George E. Edmondson Jr. (July 17, 1922 – July 2, 2019) was an insurance salesman from Tampa, Florida who was known to the University of Florida community as "Mr. Two Bits". Edmondson was a long-time fan of — and unofficial cheerleader for — the Florida Gators football team, for which he led a traditional "Two Bits' cheer" at football games from 1949 until his retirement from the role at the conclusion of the Gators' 2008 season.

Beginning with the 2009 season, a series of University of Florida students and famous alumni have taken over the Mr. Two Bits role during pregame festivities at Ben Hill Griffin Stadium. Edmondson's cheer and distinctive orange-and-blue-striped tie has also been used by the university as a symbol of alumni support.

Early life
George Edmondson was born in Atlanta, Georgia, and his family moved to Tampa, Florida when he was an infant. He attended The Citadel military school for two years, but with the beginning of World War II, he enlisted in the United States Navy and eventually became a pilot flying Grumman F6F Hellcat carrier-based fighter planes in the Pacific theater of war.

Mr. Two Bits
After the war, Edmondson returned to Tampa and worked in the insurance business. The Two Bits tradition began spontaneously in 1949, when a friend gave him a ticket to see The Citadel play against the Florida Gators in Gainesville in the season-opening game for both teams. The Gators had lost five of their last six games the previous year and were not expected to do any better. When the fans booed the players and the coach even before the opening kickoff, Edmondson decided to boost their morale by leading them in a cheer about adding up bits (a "bit" is an eighth of a dollar, so eight of them would indeed total one dollar). The Gators won the game, and fans were so enthusiastic about Edmondson's cheer that he returned the next Saturday to lead it again.

Edmondson bought season tickets for the Gators' 1950 football campaign and continued to lead the two-bits cheer. Eventually, he began leaving his seat to wander throughout the stands of Florida Field, leading the cheer in seating sections around the stadium. Edmondson continued leading the cheer at almost every Gator home game and selected road and bowl games over the next several decades. Beginning In the late 1970s, the university invited him to lead the entire crowd in the two-bits cheer from midfield as part of pregame festivities.

Edmondson was never paid for his services, and even after becoming an integral part of Florida's gameday traditions, he insisted on paying for his tickets like any other fan. In the early 1980s, Tampa Bay Buccaneers owner Hugh Culverhouse offered to pay Edmondson "real well" to lead the Two Bits cheer at his hometown Bucs games. Edmondson declined the offer, saying, "What I do for the Gators is from the heart, not from the pocketbook."

Edmondson announced his retirement from cheerleading at the end of the 1998 football season and received a game ball from head coach Steve Spurrier during an on-field ceremony before the last home game. However, he continued to occasionally lead the Two Bits cheer from his seat in the stands, and was eventually talked into once again leading the cheer from the field before each home game. He retired for good at the end of the 2008 season, and the university held another pregame ceremony before the last home game against The Citadel, the same team the Gators were playing when Edmondson began the tradition 60 seasons earlier. Edmondson did not perform the cheer again following his second retirement, saying at the time that "at 86 years of age, I've got to slow down. Nothing is forever." Edmondson and his wife, Jane, attended a few Gator home games in the season after his retirement, but thereafter  watched the contests on television from their home in Tampa.

Cheer
Edmondson used a similar routine whether he led his cheer from the stands or from the field. During the game, he would walk through the stands, wait for a break in the action, then draw attention to himself and silence the crowd by holding up a small orange and blue sign reading "2 Bits" and blowing a whistle. (He used a bugle during his first few years, but found a whistle to be easier to carry.) Once the surrounding fans quieted down, Mr. Two Bits prompted them to yell each line of the cheer with arm waves and fist pumps, encouraging them to roar after the last line.

When performing during pre-game festivities, Mr. Two Bits would be introduced and energetically jog to midfield wearing his signature outfit. Then, using the same whistle and sign and even more vigorous arm waving, he would lead the entire Florida Field crowd in the cheer. Usually, his routine came just before the entrance of the Gator football team and the opening kickoff.

As performed at the University of Florida, the Two Bits cheer is as follows: "Two Bits! Four Bits! Six Bits! A Dollar! All for the Gators, stand up and holler!"

Outfit
During his time as Mr. Two Bits, Edmonson wore a distinctive outfit consisting of a long-sleeved yellow dress shirt, an orange and blue tie, white-and-blue-striped seersucker pants, and black-and-white saddle shoes to every Gator game. This was standard attire for college football fans when he started performing the cheer in the late 1940s, and he continued to wear his "lucky" outfit to stand out in the crowd after his cheer became popular.

In recent years, the university has used the combination of Edmonson's yellow shirt and orange-and-blue-striped tie as a symbol of school spirit. It was most notably used in February 2019, when UF promoted its "Stand Up & Holler" university fund drive by mailing thousands of striped-tie stickers to alumni and university boosters and prominently displaying the tie around campus.

Legacy
Edmondson was well known to generations of Florida fans. Though he was never a University of Florida student, the school named him an honorary alumnus in 2005, and he claimed it as his new alma mater.  He was inducted into the University of Florida Athletic Hall of Fame as an "honorary letter winner" in 1992. When he died on July 2, 2019, at the age of 97, his death received coverage in national sports media.

George and Jane Edmondson established the Mr. Two Bits Scholarship Fund, which benefits a University of Florida cheerleader every year.

Celebrity Mr. Two-Bits
After Edmondson's 2008 retirement, costumed mascot Albert the Alligator donned a special Mr. Two Bits outfit to lead a pregame two-bits cheer from the field. Since 2013, Albert has been joined during pregame festivities by a famous alumnus or a student contest winner to serve as a "Celebrity Mr. Two Bits" for the day. These special guests usually wear similar clothing to that worn by the original Mr. Two Bits, and lead the crowd in the cheer in a similar whistle-blowing and arm-waving fashion. A few of the guest Mr. Two Bits have also wandered through the stands to lead various sections in the cheer like Edmondson once did.

Most Celebrity Mr. Two-Bits honorees have been popular former Gator athletic stars. The list includes Heisman Trophy-winning quarterback Danny Wuerffel, All-American and NFL Pro Bowler Cris Collinsworth, professional golfer Chris Dimarco, Olympic medal-winning swimmer Dara Torres, and members of Florida's back-to-back NCAA champion basketball team.  Heisman Trophy winning player and national championship winning coach Steve Spurrier was the Celebrity Mr. Two Bits at the first game of the 2016 season, when the field was rechristened "Steve Spurrier – Florida Field" in his honor. Since 2014, a current UF student has been selected to be the guest Mr. Two Bits for one game per season. Also since 2014, the guest Mr. Two Bits for a home game near to Veterans Day has been a veteran with close ties to the university.

See also 
 List of University of Florida Athletic Hall of Fame members

References

External links
 CBS Sports report on Mr. Two Bits

1922 births
2019 deaths
Florida Gators football
People from Tampa, Florida
Spectators of American football
United States Navy pilots of World War II
American cheerleaders